Drozdovo is a rural locality (a village) in Kubenskoye Rural Settlement, Vologodsky District, Vologda Oblast, Russia. The population was 23 as of 2002.

Geography 
Drozdovo is located 44 km northwest of Vologda (the district's administrative centre) by road. Alexeyevo is the nearest rural locality.

References 

Rural localities in Vologodsky District